Spassk-Ryazansky is a town and the administrative center of Spassky District in Ryazan Oblast, Russia, located on the shores of Lake Spasskoye,  southeast of Ryazan, the administrative center of the oblast. Population:

History
It was founded in 1629 as the sloboda of Vaskina Polyana. In 1778, it was renamed Spassk and granted town status. In 1929, the town was given its present name.

Administrative and municipal status
Within the framework of administrative divisions, Spassk-Ryazansky serves as the administrative center of Spassky District. As an administrative division, it is incorporated within Spassky District as the town of district significance of Spassk-Ryazansky. As a municipal division, the town of district significance of Spassk-Ryazansky is incorporated within Spassky Municipal District as Spassk-Ryazanskoye Urban Settlement.

References

Notes

Sources

Cities and towns in Ryazan Oblast
Spassky Uyezd (Ryazan Governorate)
Populated places established in 1629
1629 establishments in Russia